The Kostka (Kostkowie) was a Polish noble family (szlachta) originated from Kashubia.

Members
 Anna Kostka
 Jan Kostka
 Katarzyna Kostka
 Stanisław Kostka (1550–1568)
 Stanisław Kostka (1475–1555)

Coat of arms

The Kostka family used the "Dąbrowa" arms.

References
 Jerzy Antoni Kostka, Kostkowie herbu Dabrowa, stron 480, Wydawca "POLIMER" Koszalin 2010r. 
 Przemysław Pragert: Herbarz rodzin kaszubskich. T. 2. BiT, 2007, s. 101–105, 256. .